Tamayoa decolorata is a species of air-breathing land snail,a terrestrial pulmonate gastropod mollusk in the family Scolodontidae.

Distribution 
The distribution of Tamayoa decolorata includes:
 Jamaica
 Guadeloupe
 Dominica This species is probably an introduced one in Dominica, as it was found only in disturbed habitats.
 Martinique
 Barbados
 Saint Vincent
 Tobago
 Trinidad
 French Guiana
 Brazil

References
This article incorporates CC-BY-3.0 text from the reference

External links 

Scolodontidae
Gastropods described in 1859